

William R. Bascom (May 23, 1912 – September 11, 1981) was an award-winning American folklorist, anthropologist, and museum director. He was a specialist in the art and culture of West Africa and the African Diaspora, especially the Yoruba of Nigeria.

Biography 
Bascom completed his B.A. at the University of Wisconsin, and earned his Ph.D. in anthropology at Northwestern University under Melville J. Herskovits in 1939, which was based on research carried out amongst the Yoruba. Bascom was the first American anthropologist to carry out fieldwork among the Yoruba.

Bascom taught at Northwestern, Cambridge University. During World War II, he joined the O.S.S. and together with Ralph Bunche co-authored an unsigned volume, A Pocket Guide to West Africa in 1943.

Post-war, Bascom and his Cuban-born wife, Berta began research into practices of Yoruba origin - such as the Shango cult and Santeria - in Cuba and elsewhere. Berta was a lifelong co-worker with Bascom.

In 1957 he left Northwestern University for the University of California, Berkeley where he become the first director of the Lowie Museum of Anthropology, a post he held until his retirement in 1979. Bascom also helped in the creation of the Master's Degree programme at Berkeley in 1965.

Several of Bascom's articles on folkloristics serve as texts in graduate courses in folklore: his essays were regularly anthologised during his career.  Published posthumously, Bascom's African folktales in the New World (1992) has been credited with making important contributions to debates around "diffusion and independent invention".

Recognition 
Bascom served as president of the American Folklore Society between 1953 and 1954. His two Presidential Addresses were titled “Four Functions of Folklore” and "Verbal Art". His book Ifa Divination: Communication Between Gods and Men in West Africa was awarded the Pitrè Prize.

Four functions of folklore 
In a major article published in 1954, Bascom argued that folklore can serve four primary functions in a culture: 
 Folklore lets people escape from repressions imposed upon them by society e.g.: tall tales
 Folklore validates culture, justifying its rituals and institutions to those who perform and observe them. 
 Folklore is a pedagogic device which reinforces morals and values and builds wit. e.g.: scary stories/moral lessons 
 Folklore is a means of applying social pressure and exercising social control. e.g.: the boy who cried wolf

Major works 
 Bascom, William R. (1943). "The Relationship of Yoruba Folklore to Divining," The Journal of American Folklore, 56(220), 127–131. https://doi.org/10.2307/535726
 Bascom, William R. (1943). The Sociological Role of the Yoruba Cult-Group. Menasha (Wis.): American Anthropological Association. .
 Bascom, William R. (1947). Ponape: A Pacific Economy in Transition 
 Bascom, William R. (1954). "Four Functions of Folklore". The Journal of American Folklore. 67 (266): 333–349. . . JSTOR 536411.
 Bascom, William R. (1955). "Urbanization Among the Yoruba," American Journal of Sociology.  60(5), 446–454. http://www.jstor.org/stable/2772532
 Bascom, William R. (1955). "Verbal Art," The Journal of American Folklore, 68(269), 245–252. https://doi.org/10.2307/536902
 Bascom, William R.; Herskovits, Melville J (eds.) (1959). Continuity and Change in African Culture 
 Bascom, William R. (1964). "Folklore Research in Africa," The Journal of American Folklore, 77(303), 12–31. https://doi.org/10.2307/538015
 Bascom, William R. (1965). "The Forms of Folklore: Prose Narratives". The Journal of American Folklore, 78(307), 3–20. https://doi.org/10.2307/538099 
 Bascom, William R. (1969). The Yoruba of Southwestern Nigeria. New York; Chicago: Holt Rinehart and Winston. . .
 Bascom, William R. (1969). Ifa Divination: Communication Between Gods and Men in West Africa. Bloomington: Indiana University Press. .
 Bascom, William R. (1973). African Art in Cultural Perspective: An Introduction. New York: Norton. . .
 Bascom, William R. (1973). "Folklore, Verbal Art, and Culture," The Journal of American Folklore, 86(342), 374–381. https://doi.org/10.2307/539361
 Bascom, William R. (ed.) (1975). African Dilemma Tales. The Hague: Mouton. . .
 Bascom, William R. (ed.) (1977). Frontiers of Folklore. Boulder, Colo.: Published by Westview Press for the American Association for the Advancement of Science, Washington, D.C. . .
 Bascom, William R. (1980). Sixteen Cowries: Yoruba Divination from Africa to the New World. Bloomington: Indiana Univ. Pr. .
 Bascom, William R. (1992). African folktales in the New World. Bloomington: Indiana University Press. . .

References

Sources 
 Robert Georges & Michael Owen Jones, Folkloristics: An Introduction, Indiana University Press, 1995, pp. 171–192.
 Daniel Crowley and Alan Dundes, "Obituary: William Russel Bascom," Journal of American Folklore 95 (1982): 465–7.
 Phoebe A. Hearst Museum of Anthropology website - History page

American folklorists
American ethnologists
American curators
1981 deaths
1912 births
Anthropologists of the Yoruba
University of Wisconsin–Madison alumni
Northwestern University alumni
Academics of the University of Cambridge
University of California, Berkeley College of Letters and Science faculty
People of the Office of Strategic Services
20th-century American anthropologists
Presidents of the American Folklore Society